Garelli may refer to:
 Garelli Motorcycles, an Italian moped and motorcycle manufacturer
 Carla Garelli, teen model from Paraguay
 Paul Garelli (1924–2006), French Assyriologist and professor
 Vincenza Garelli della Morea (1859–1920s), Italian pianist and composer
 Jacques Garelli (1931–2014), French-language poet and philosopher